Henri Dauban de Silhouette (7 July 1901 – 23 May 1991) was a British athlete. He competed in the men's javelin throw at the 1924 Summer Olympics.

References

External links
 

1901 births
1991 deaths
Athletes (track and field) at the 1924 Summer Olympics
British male javelin throwers
Olympic athletes of Great Britain
Place of birth missing